Maria Mollestad (born 23 July 1996) is a Norwegian windsurfer.

She qualified for competing at the 2016 Summer Olympics in Rio de Janeiro.

Personal life
Mollestad was born in Bærum on 23 July 1996.

References

1992 births
Living people
Sportspeople from Bærum
Norwegian windsurfers
Sailors at the 2016 Summer Olympics – RS:X
Olympic sailors of Norway
Female windsurfers